Freedom and Democracy Day is a national holiday in Chad, falling on 1 December.  Government offices and businesses close.  The holiday commemorates the overthrow of Hissène Habré by Idriss Déby in 1990.

Notes and references 

Remembrance days
December observances
Chadian culture